'Snake dance' is a term used to refer to a parade before or during a high school or a related event like a football game. The parade includes floats built by each high school class, marching bands, students, and alumni. Snake dance may also be more narrowly used to describe a student parade, a line of students celebrating, or a parade starting in a central business district or school location and ending with an evening bonfire and pep rally near the school. The University of Northern Iowa archives refer to snake dance as early as 1922. A 1911 Associated Press dispatch covering Philadelphia fans celebrating the Philadelphia Athletics victory in Game 2 of the 1911 World Series reported, "Staid business and professional men joined their office boys and ragged urchins in a snake dance around city hall".

References

External links

Tarleton College Homecoming Schedule with Snake Dance  
University of Northern Iowa Homecoming Archives 
Carleton College "Freshman Snake Dance Between Football Games 

American culture
School dances